Jessica Renee Williams (born ) is an American actress and comedian. She has appeared as a senior correspondent on The Daily Show, as cohost of the podcast 2 Dope Queens, as Lally Hicks in the Fantastic Beasts film series, and in Apple TV+‘s Shrinking series.

Early life
Jessica Renee Williams was born in Los Angeles County, California. She attended Nathaniel Narbonne High School where she flourished in the school's drama department. She made her television debut as a series regular on the Nickelodeon series Just for Kicks in 2006, and in 2012, she became The Daily Show'''s youngest correspondent ever at 22 years old. She attended California State University, Long Beach. Results of a DNA test traced Williams's maternal ancestry to the Bamileke people of Cameroon.

Career
Williams made her Daily Show debut on January 11, 2012. Williams is a frequent performer at the Upright Citizens Brigade Theatre in Los Angeles. Williams also made appearances on Season 3 of HBO's Girls. She currently resides in Brooklyn, New York  and Los Angeles, California. She appears in the film People Places Things. She cohosted the comedy podcast 2 Dope Queens with Phoebe Robinson. Williams appears in an HBO special spun off from the podcast in February, 2018. She appeared on her last Daily Show episode on June 30, 2016. She is the star of the 2017 Netflix comedy movie The Incredible Jessica James, in which she portrays a character whom the Guardian described as "a struggling Brooklyn-based playwright navigating the murky waters of modern romance while waiting impatiently for her big break." She appeared in the sequels of Fantastic Beasts and Where to Find Them, titled Fantastic Beasts: The Crimes of Grindelwald and Fantastic Beasts: The Secrets of Dumbledore'' as Lally Hicks, a teacher from Ilvermorny School of Witchcraft and Wizardry.

Filmography

Film

Television

Podcast

References

External links

Living people
Actresses from Los Angeles County, California
African-American actresses
American child actresses
American film actresses
American people of Cameroonian descent
American television actresses
American voice actresses
American women comedians
California State University, Long Beach alumni
21st-century American actresses
Comedians from California
American women podcasters
American podcasters
Upright Citizens Brigade Theater performers
21st-century American comedians
African-American female comedians
21st-century African-American women
21st-century African-American people
20th-century African-American people
20th-century African-American women
Bamileke people
Year of birth missing (living people)